Ruy González de Clavijo (died 2 April 1412) was a Castilian traveler and writer. In 1403-05 Clavijo was the ambassador of Henry III of Castile to the court of Timur, founder and ruler of the Timurid Empire. A diary of the journey, perhaps based on detailed notes kept while traveling, was later published in Spanish in 1582 (Embajada a Tamorlán) and in English in 1859 (Narrative of the Embassy of Ruy Gonzalez de Clavijo to the Court of Timour at Samarcand AD 1403-6).

The embassy to Samarkand
Clavijo, a nobleman of Madrid and chamberlain to the king, set sail from Cadiz on 21 May 1403 in the company of Timur's ambassador, Muhammed al-Kazi, a Dominican friar, Alfonso Páez de Santa María, one of the king's guards, Gómez de Salazar, and other unnamed Castilians. Clavijo sailed through the Mediterranean, passing Majorca, Sicily and Rhodes to Constantinople.  Using modern names for the countries through which he passed, Clavijo sailed along the Black Sea coast of Anatolia to Trebizond and then overland through Armenia and Iran to Turkestan. He visited Tehran in 1404. The original intention was to meet with Timur at his winter pasturage in the Kingdom of Georgia, but due to foul weather conditions and a shipwreck, the embassy was forced to return to Constantinople and spend the winter of 1403-1404 there.

After setting sail from Constantinople across the Black Sea, the entourage spent the following months following in the wake of Timur's army, but were unable to catch up to the rapidly moving, mounted horde.  It is for this reason that the Castilian delegation continued all the way to Timur's capital at Samarkand, in modern Uzbekistan, arriving there on 8 September 1404, occasioning the most detailed contemporary description of Timur's court by a westerner. Clavijo found the city in a constant cycle of construction and rebuilding, in search of perfection:
The Mosque which Timur had caused to be built to the memory of the mother of his wife... seemed to us to be the noblest of all we visited in the city of Samarkand, but no sooner had it been completed than he began to find fault with its entrance gateway, which he now said was much too low and must be pulled down.

Clavijo's long-sought first audience with Timur was in "a great orchard with a palace therein", the paradise garden of Iranian tradition, where Clavijo gave detailed descriptions of the trained and painted elephants he saw, and the tent-pavilions of jewel- and pearl-encrusted silks with tassels and banners that fluttered in the wind. The embassy spent several months in Samarkand, during which time the Castilians attended celebrations for Timur's recent victory at Ankara in July 1402 over the Turkish sultan, Bayezid I, whom he captured, relieving Western fears of Ottoman expansion in Hungary and spurring the desire for diplomatic connections on the part of Charles VI of France as well as Henry of Castile. Unable to procure a letter from Timur for their king, Henry, due to Timur's ill health (Timur's final illness), the Castilians were forced to depart Samarkand on 21 November 1404, due to Timur's impending death.

See also
Chronology of European exploration of Asia
Timurid relations with Europe
Chen Cheng (Ming Dynasty) - a Chinese envoy who visited Samarkand a few years after de Clavijo
Travel literature

Notes

Attribution

External links
 Historia del gran Tamorlan e itinerario y enarracion del viage, y relacion de la Embaxada que Ruy Gonçalez de Clavijo le hizo, por mandado del muy poderoso Señor Rey Don Henrique el Tercero de Castilla, y un breve discurso fecho por Gonçalo Argote de Molina, para mayor inteligencia deste libro…, original Spanish text on the site of the Biblioteca virtual Miguel de Cervantes
Full text of the Embassy, trans. C.R. Markham. on Google Books; also on Internet Archive
Excerpt from González de Clavijo's Embassy to Tamerlane 1403-1406 (trans. Guy le Strange, New York and London, 1928).
 Another excerpt from González de Clavijo's Embassy to Tamerlane 1403-1406 (trans. Guy le Strange, New York and London, 1928).
"Vida y hazañas del Gran Tamorlán, con la descripción de las tierras de su imperio y señorío", by Ruy González de Clavijo (modern Spanish)

Further reading 
Ruy González de Clavijo, La embajada a Tamorlán. Francisco López Estrada, ed.  (Madrid: Castalia, 1999).
Ruy González de Clavijo, Embassy to Tamerlane tr. G. Le Strange (1928).
Ruy González de Clavijo, Embassy to Tamerlane, 1403-1406, translated by Guy Le Strange, with a new Introduction by Caroline Stone (Hardinge Simpole, 2009).

14th-century births
1412 deaths
15th-century travel writers
Spanish travel writers
Spanish explorers
Explorers of Asia
Historians of Iran
Spanish diplomats
Timur
14th-century Castilians
15th-century Castilians
15th-century Spanish writers